This is an alphabetized list of notable pianists who play or played pop and rock music.

A
Kris Allen
Art Alexakis
Tori Amos
Trey Anastasio (Phish)
Benny Andersson
Fiona Apple
David Archuleta
Billie Joe Armstrong (Green Day)
Kenneth Ascher
Tony Ashton
Aslyn
Bryce Avary (The Rocket Summer)

B
Bill Bailey
Burt Bacharach
Alex Band (The Calling)
Anita Baker
Farrokh Bulsara
Tony Banks
Steve Barakatt
Sara Bareilles
Samantha Barks
Gary Barlow (Take That)
Joshua Bassett
Mark Batson 
Eric Bazilian (The Hooters)
Barry Beckett (Muscle Shoals Rhythm Section)
Drake Bell
Richard Bell (Janis Joplin, The Band)
Thom Bell
Matthew Bellamy (Muse)
Bill Berry 
Diane Birch
Roy Bittan
Jon Bon Jovi
James Booker
Roddy Bottum (Faith No More)
Owen Bradley
Michelle Branch 
Jim Brickman
David Briggs (Muscle Shoals Rhythm Section, Area Code 615, The Nashville A-Team)
Gary Brooker (Procol Harum) 
Dudley Brooks (The Blue Moon Boys, The Crickets)
Tony Brown
Jackson Browne
David Bryan
Jessie Buckley
Kim Bullard
John Bundrick
Terry Burrus
Kate Bush
Artie Butler
Larry Butler
Brad Buxer

C
Jonathan Cain
John Cale
Vanessa Carlton
Tim Carmon
Richard Carpenter
David Cassidy
Jo Ann Castle
Leonard Caston Jr. 
Nick Cave
Les Claypool (Primus)
Greyson Chance
Ray Charles
Richard Clayderman
Doug Clifford
Nat King Cole
Rahn Coleman
Phil Collins
Chi Coltrane
Harry Connick Jr.
Russ Conway
Kyle Cook (Matchbox Twenty)
Stu Cook
Floyd Cramer
Dave Crawford
Kevin Cronin (REO Speedwagon)
Sheryl Crow
Allison Crowe
Jamie Cullum
Burton Cummings (The Guess Who)
Miley Cyrus

D
Ray Davies
Rick Davies
Paul Davis
John Deacon (Queen)
Deadmau5
Chris de Burgh
Brian Dee
Lynsey De Paul
Franco De Vita
Gavin DeGraw
Dennis DeYoung
Al De Lory
Raúl di Blasio
Jim Dickinson 
Fats Domino
Craig Doerge (The Section)
Paul Doucette (Matchbox Twenty)
Neal Doughty (REO Speedwagon)
Dr. John
Daryl Dragon (Captain & Tennille)
Nick Drake
Bob Dylan
Jakob Dylan

E
The Edge (U2)
Keith Emerson
Bobby Emmons (The Memphis Boys)
Brian Eno
John Evan
Tommy Eyre

F
Donald Fagen (Steely Dan)
Agnetha Fältskog
Billy Field
Victor Feldman
Johnny Fingers
Mike Finnigan
Five for Fighting
Roberta Flack
Tom Fletcher
Chloe Flower
Dan Fogelberg
John Fogerty
Ben Folds
David Foster
Aretha Franklin
Jason Freese
Glenn Frey
Robert Fripp
Hans-Jürgen Fritz (Triumvirat)
Craig Frost

G
Peter Gabriel
Gackt Camui
Lady Gaga
Charly García
Mike Garson
Marvin Gaye
Aviv Geffen
Stefani Germanotta (Lady Gaga)
Maurice Gibb (Bee Gees)
Gregg Giuffria
Dwayne Goettel
Andrew Gold
Selena Gomez
Phillip Goodhand-Tait
Delta Goodrem
David Gray
Dave Greenslade
Jonny Greenwood (Radiohead)
Paul Griffin
Johnny Griffith
Christina Grimmie
Dave Grohl
Horacio Gutierrez

H
Emily Haines
Daryl Hall
Jan Hammer
Peter Hammill (Van der Graaf Generator)
Arthur Hanlon 
Taylor Hanson
Ed Harcourt
Glen Hardin (The Crickets, TCB Band)
Corey Hart
Donny Hathaway
Yoshiki Hayashi
Isaac Hayes
Imogen Heap
Jimi Hendrix
Don Henley
Ken Hensley (Uriah Heep)
Melissa Morrison Higgins
David Hodges
Roger Hodgson (Supertramp)
Jacob Hoggard (Hedley)
Jools Holland
Tuomas Holopainen (Nightwish)
Danielle Hope
Nicky Hopkins
Bruce Hornsby
Paul Hornsby (The Marshall Tucker Band)
Joey Huffman
Grayson Hugh
Joe Hunter
Eric Hutchinson
Dick Hyman
Rob Hyman (The Hooters)

I
Dami Im

J
Janet Jackson
Joe Jackson
Michael Jackson
Randy Jackson
Mick Jagger
Bob James
Keith Jarrett (King Crimson)
John Barlow Jarvis
Chris Jasper
Arthur Jenkins
Karl Jenkins Soft Machine
Billy Joel
Elton John
Booker T. Jones (Booker T. & the M.G.'s)
Howard Jones
John Paul Jones
Norah Jones
Rickie Lee Jones
Johnnie Johnson
Bruce Johnston
Joe Jonas
Kevin Jonas
Nick Jonas
Scott Joplin
Bradley Joseph
Tyler Joseph
Tim Jupp
Victoria Justice

K
Yuki Kajiura
Tony Kaye (Yes)
Shane Keister
Paula Kelley
Mark Kelly
R. Kelly
Ron Kersey
Alicia Keys
Carole King
Larry Knechtel 
Todor Kobakov
Al Kooper
Chantal Kreviazuk
Diana Krall
Lenny Kravitz

L
Denny Laine
Robert Lamm (Chicago)
Dustin Lanker (Cherry Poppin' Daddies, The Visible Men)
Avril Lavigne
Chuck Leavell
Amy Lee (Evanescence)
Thijs Van Leer (Focus)
John Legend
Tom Lehrer
John Lennon
Martin Leung
Jerry Lee Lewis
Liberace
Little Richard
Jon Lord (Deep Purple)
Christian "Flake" Lorenz (Rammstein)
Demi Lovato

M
Tony MacAlpine
Ron Mael (Sparks)
Les Maguire
Dmitry Malikov
Barry Manilow
Bob Malone
Richard Manuel (The Band)
Ray Manzarek
Laura Marano
Marina and the Diamonds
Page McConnell (Phish)
Bruno Mars
Tommy Mars
Anthony Marinelli (Michael Jackson's Thriller, Kenny Loggins) 
Chris Martin (Coldplay)
George Martin (The Beatles, Wings, Gerry and the Pacemakers)
Richard Marx
James Maslow
Andre Matos
Dave Matthews
John McAll 
Jesse McCartney
Linda McCartney
Paul McCartney
Clarence McDonald
Michael McDonald
Goldy McJohn (Steppenwolf)
Nellie McKay
Brian McKnight
Sarah McLachlan
Ian McLagan
Jon Mclaughlin
Andrew McMahon
Christine McVie
Shawn Mendes
Natalie Merchant
Freddie Mercury (Queen)
Lisa Middelhauve (Xandria)
Amos Milburn 
Tomo Miličević (Thirty Seconds to Mars)
Bill Miller (Frank Sinatra, Frank Sinatra Jr.)
Ben Mills
Mike Mills
Ronnie Milsap
Tim Minchin
Ben Mink
Kerry Minnear (Gentle Giant)
Joni Mitchell
Money Mark (Beastie Boys, The Claypool Lennon Delirium)
Gilbert Montagné
Ben Moody
Patrick Moraz (Refugee, Yes, Moody Blues)
Jason Mraz

N
Graham Nash
Steve Nathan (Muscle Shoals Rhythm Section, The Nashville A-Team)
Bobbie Nelson
Art Neville (The Meters, The Neville Brothers)
Ivan Neville
Randy Newman
Joanna Newsom
Stevie Nicks
Steve Nieve
Willie Nile
Jack Nitzsche
Laura Nyro

O
Conor Oberst
Bobby Ogdin (TCB Band, The Marshall Tucker Band)
Mike Oldfield
Spooner Oldham 
Michael Omartian
Alan Osmond
Donny Osmond
Wayne Osmond
Gilbert O'Sullivan

P
Fito Páez
David Paich
Amanda Palmer
Bill Payne
Charlie Peacock
Leon Pendarvis
Roger Penney
Freddie Perren
Christina Perri
Niamh Perry (Small engine voices)
Norman Petty (The Crickets, Buddy Holly)
Tom Petty
Liz Phair
Greg Phillinganes
Dave Pirner
Pierre-Yves Plat
Morris Pleasure
Steve Porcaro
Billy Powell (Lynyrd Skynyrd)
Daniel Powter
Billy Preston
Don Preston
Prince
Vadim Pruzhanov
Bill Pursell

Q
Sara Quin
Tegan Quin

R
Bonnie Raitt
Don Randi 
Mike Ratledge Soft Machine
Eddie Rayner (Split Enz)
Dizzy Reed (Guns N' Roses)
Trent Reznor (Nine Inch Nails)
Tim Rice-Oxley (Keane)
Keith Richards 
Lionel Richie
Francis Rimbert
Billy Ritchie
Tyson Ritter (The All-American Rejects)
Hargus "Pig" Robbins
Smokey Robinson 
Olivia Rodrigo
Shahrdad Rohani
Gregg Rolie (Santana, Journey)
Matt Rollings
Aldemaro Romero
Axl Rose (Guns N' Roses)
Ryan Ross (Panic! at the Disco)
Michel Rubini
Jordan Rudess (also a jazz pianist)
Todd Rundgren
Patrice Rushen
Ruslana
Brenda Russell
Leon Russell

S
Joe Sample
David Sancious
Pete Sears
Neil Sedaka 
Bob Seger
Ralph Schuckett
Paul Shaffer
Derek Sherinian (Dream Theater)
Mike Shinoda (Linkin Park)
Bunny Sigler
Nicole Simone
Nina Simone
Ray Singleton
Isaac Slade (The Fray)
Grace Slick (Jefferson Airplane)
Robert Smith (The Cure)
Tom Snow
Regina Spektor
Bruce Springsteen
Chris Stainton 
Rachel Stevens
Dave Stewart
Ian Stewart (The Rolling Stones)
Stephen Stills 
Barrett Strong
Patrick Stump
Taylor Swift

T
Richard Tandy
Serj Tankian
James Taylor
Roger Taylor (Queen)
Ryan Tedder (OneRepublic)
Richard Tee
Benmont Tench
Vienna Teng
John Tesh
Matt Thiessen
Marvell Thomas 
Rob Thomas (Matchbox Twenty)
Sonny Thompson
Yann Tiersen
Justin Timberlake
Keith Tippett
Allen Toussaint 
Pete Townshend
Meghan Trainor
Alex Turner (Arctic Monkeys)
Archie Turner (Hi Rhythm Section)
Ike Turner
Tarja Turunen
Aphex Twin
Steven Tyler (Aerosmith)

U
Brendon Urie (Panic! at the Disco)
Michael Utley

V
Ruben Valtierra 
Earl Van Dyke (The Funk Brothers)
Vangelis
Eddie Van Halen
Marián Varga
Joe Vitale

W
Andrew W. K.
Rufus Wainwright
Tom Waits
Adam Wakeman
Oliver Wakeman
Rick Wakeman
Don Walker
Joe Walsh
Steve Walsh (Kansas)
Biff Watson
Barry White
Norman Whitfield
Bobby Whitlock 
Roger Williams
Ann Wilson (Heart)
Brian Wilson
Carl Wilson
Dennis Wilson
George Winston
Edgar Winter
Steve Winwood
Bill Withers
Patrick Wolf
Peter Wolf
Stevie Wonder
Alan White (Yes, Magnification)
Gary Wright
Richard Wright (Pink Floyd)
Zakk Wylde
Bill Wyman
Reese Wynans

Y
Yanni
Akiko Yano
Thom Yorke (Radiohead)
Neil Young
Yoshiki Hayashi (X Japan)

Z
Warren Zevon
Torrie Zito

Pop pianists
Rock pianists
P
pop and rock pianists
Pianists